Temple is a neighbourhood in the northeast quadrant of Calgary, Alberta. It is bounded to the north by McKnight Boulevard, to the east by 68 Street E, to the south by 32 Avenue N and to the west by 52 Street E.

The land was annexed to the City of Calgary in 1961 and the neighbourhood (then named "The Properties" was established and development begun in 1977. "The Properties" were subsequently divided into Temple, Pineridge, Rundle and Whitehorn. It is represented in the Calgary City Council by the Ward 5 councillor.

Demographics

Residents in this community had a median household income of $59,074 in 2000, and there were 18.7% low income residents living in the neighbourhood. As of 2000, 30% of the residents were immigrants, predominantly of East Indian origin. A proportion of 5.4% of the buildings were condominiums or apartments, and 22.6% of the housing was used for renting.

Education
The community is served by Annie Foote Elementary and Guy Weadick Elementary public schools, as well as by St. Thomas More Elementary and Father Scollen Elementary & Junior High (Catholic).

See also
List of neighbourhoods in Calgary

References

External links
Temple Community Association
Temple Community Association website

Neighbourhoods in Calgary